Kungshamra is a residential area in Bergshamra, Solna Municipality, Sweden, in the northern outskirts of Stockholm. It has about 1370 student flats. The older houses (about 820 of them) are in raw concrete with bold colours on window frames and doors. Newer houses (550, built during 2003-2005) are painted in gray or white, and decorated with French balconies and yellow windows.

See also 

 Geography of Stockholm
 Education in Stockholm

Geography of Stockholm
Districts of Stockholm